St Paul's Girls' School is a private day school for girls, aged 11 to 18, located in Brook Green, Hammersmith, in West London, England.

History

St Paul's Girls' School was founded by the Worshipful Company of Mercers in 1904, using part of the endowment of the foundation set up by John Colet, to create a girls' school to complement the boys' school he had founded in the sixteenth century. The governors hold proprietorial responsibility, and some are representatives of the Universities of Oxford, Cambridge and London.

The buildings for the school were designed by the architect Gerald Horsley, son of the painter John Callcott Horsley and one of the founder members of the Art Workers Guild.

The school has had several distinguished directors of music, most notably Gustav Holst (1905–34) and Herbert Howells (1936–62). Holst composed his St Paul's and Brook Green suites for the pupils at the school. Holst also composed what is arguably his best known work, "The Planets", while teaching at St Paul's. John Linton Gardner held a part-time position as director of music at the school.

Exam results
St Paul's girls regularly perform extremely well in the GCSEs and A Levels. In 2014, 99.3% of GCSEs were graded at A*s or As with 93.6% graded at A* alone. This was the highest ever A* percentage achieved by the school and in the country. In 2016, the school achieved the highest A Level results in its history with 60.0% of entries achieving an A* grade and 93.8% of entries achieving A* or A grades.

In the 2020 GCSE and IGCSE results, students were awarded the higher of their centre-assessed grade and the statistically adjusted calculated grade. 86% of entries were awarded a 9 grade (1% point higher than the 2019 outcome) and 97.9% of entries gained an 8 or 9 (which are equivalent to the old A* grade). 
In the 2020 A level and Pre-U results, 64.6% of entries attained an A* grade at A level or the Pre-U equivalent D1 or D2, while 92.4% of entries achieved an A* or A grade and 98.4% a B grade or higher (or the Pre-U equivalent).

Music
Gustav Holst was director of music at the school from 1905 to 1934 when he died, including the period he composed his orchestral suites, including St Paul's Suite and The Planets. He was succeeded by Herbert Howells before John Gardner followed in the 1960s.  Gardner wrote many memorable pieces for the school, including his popular Christmas carols Tomorrow Shall Be My Dancing Day and The Holly and the Ivy. Hilary Davan Wetton was director of music from 1979 to 1994. In 1988 a CD with Children's favorite songs was released on the label Spectrum records.

Drama
The school's main theatre, where most school productions are staged, is named after alumna Celia Johnson. Other productions are staged in the drama studio which is a smaller space.

Bursaries and scholarships

Bursaries
The school awards means-tested bursaries to students who join in Y7 and for students arriving in Y12. Bursaries fund up to 100% of tuition fees on a sliding scale depending on family income and assets, plus exam entry fees and a grant towards textbooks. Holders of 100% bursaries entering in Y12 also receive an extra package to cover additional expenses, such as the cost of sports equipment and music tuition.

Scholarships
Year 7: The school awards up to four academic scholarships and, usually, about three or four music scholarships to 11+ entrants (worth £100 a year; the music scholarship also includes free tuition in two instruments).

Year 12: The school may also award music scholarships to current students and to new joiners (worth free tuition in two instruments), and two art scholarships (worth £250 a year) to internal and external candidates. The Nora Day music scholarship (worth up to 50% of school fees plus free tuition in two instruments) is awarded every other year to a new joiner who shows exceptional musical potential. The school also awards scholarships worth £250 a year for academic distinction in the "Senior Scholarship", a dissertation written by students in the summer holiday following Y12.

Sport

Rowing
The school has an active rowing club called the St Paul's Girls' School Boat Club which is based on the River Thames. The club is affiliated to British Rowing (boat code SPG) and has produced four British champion crews at the 1992 British Rowing Championships, 2002 British Rowing Championships, 2003 British Rowing Championships and 2011 British Rowing Championships.

High Mistresses
The headmistress of St Paul's Girls' School is known as the High Mistress.

Frances Ralph Grey (d.1935), High Mistress 1903–1927
Ethel Strudwick (1880–1954), High Mistress 1927–1948, daughter of the Pre-Raphaelite painter John Melhuish Strudwick
Margaret Osborn (1906–1985), High Mistress 1948–1963
Alison Munro (1914–2008), High Mistress 1964–1974
Heather Brigstocke, Baroness Brigstocke (1929–2004), High Mistress 1974–1989
Helen Elizabeth Webber Williams (born 1938), High Mistress 1989–1992
Janet Gough (born 1940), High Mistress 1993–1998
Elizabeth Mary Diggory (1945–2007), High Mistress 1998–2006
Clarissa Mary Farr (born 1958), High Mistress 2006–2017
Sarah Fletcher, High Mistress 2017–present

Old Paulinas

Alumnae of the school, known as "Old Paulinas", include:

Arts

 Gillian Ayres – artist
 Mischa Barton – actress
 Nicola Beauman – publisher, founder of Persephone Books
 Helen Binyon  – artist
 Lesley Blanch – author
 Justin Blanco White – architect
 Celia Brayfield – author
 Sophie Hunter – theatre and opera director
 Brigid Brophy – dramatist
 Lucy Briers  – actress
 Margaret Calvert – graphic artist
 Miranda Carter – biographer
 Edie Campbell – model
 Cecilia Chancellor – model
 Joan Cross – singer
 Emma Darwin – author
 Monica Dickens – author
 Suzi Digby – conductor and musician
 Flora Fraser – author
 Justine Frischmann – musician
 Gluck (Hannah Gluckstein) – artist
 Francesca Gonshaw – actress
 Imogen Holst – musician
 Ursula Howells – actress
 Celia Johnson – actress
 Rachel Johnson – journalist and editor
 Jane M. Joseph – musician and composer
 Amy Key Clarke – poet and author
 Marghanita Laski – author
 Nicola LeFanu – composer
 Amanda Levete – architect
 Alice Lowe – actress/author
 Jessica Mann – author
 Yvonne Mitchell – actress/author
 Emily Mortimer – actress
 Santha Rama Rau – author
 Joely Richardson – actress
 Natasha Richardson – actress
 Georgina Rylance – actress
 Katherine Shonfield – architect
 Dodie Smith – playwright
 Catherine Storr – author
 Imogen Stubbs – actress
 Emma Tennant – author
 Angela Thirkell – author
 Mary Treadgold – author
 Salley Vickers – author
 Samantha Weinberg – author
 Rachel Weisz – actress
 Antonia White – author

Business
 Isabel dos Santos – wealthiest woman in Africa as of 2020
Grace Beverley – founder of Tala and Shreddy

Culinary arts
 Thomasina Miers – chef and founder of Wahaca restaurant chain
 Henrietta Lovell – founder of the Rare Tea Company

Education
 Eleanora Carus-Wilson – economic historian
 Sheila Forbes – principal, St Hilda's College, Oxford 
Henrietta Harrison – professor of Modern Chinese Studies, University of Oxford
 Jessica Rawson – warden, Merton College, Oxford
 Barbara Reynolds – scholar
 Joan Robinson – economist

Humanitarianism
 Myrtle Solomon – pacifist and former chair War Resisters' International

Law
 Sonia Proudman – High Court Judge

Journalism and media

 Emily Buchanan – BBC World Affairs correspondent
 Clemency Burton-Hill – broadcaster and author
 Edie Campbell – model and socialite
 Victoria Coren Mitchell – presenter, poker player
 Daisy Donovan – TV presenter
 Stephanie Flanders – BBC Economics editor
 Amelia Gentleman – journalist
 Bronwen Maddox – senior journalist at 'The Times' newspaper
 Veronica Pedrosa – Al Jazeera English correspondent
 Sophie Raworth – news reader
 Susanna Reid – news presenter
 Anne Scott-James – journalist and editor
 Alexandra Shulman – editor-in-chief, Vogue 1992–2017 
 Carol Thatcher – journalist
 Erica Wagner – author, critic, and literary editor of The Times
 Eirene White, Baroness White – journalist and Labour politician
 Petronella Wyatt – journalist

Politics
 Jane Bonham Carter – Liberal Democrat peer 
 Vicky Ford, Conservative MP and formerly MEP
 Harriet Harman – Labour MP, former Acting Leader of the Labour Party, former Leader of the Opposition and former Cabinet minister
 Susan Kramer – former Liberal Democrat MP
 Mavis Tate – Conservative MP and women's rights campaigner
 Anne-Marie Trevelyan, Conservative MP
 Jo Valentine, Baroness Valentine – member of the British House of Lords
 Eirene White, Baroness White – Labour Minister of State then life peer
 Shirley Williams – former Labour Education Secretary and co-founder of the Social Democratic Party

Science
 Kate Bingham – venture capitalist
 Ruth Bowden – anatomist
 Caroline Deys – doctor
 Rosalind Franklin – scientist, research led to discovery of the structure of DNA 
 Jean Ginsburg – physiologist, endocrinologist
 Christine Hamill – mathematician
 Kathleen Kenyon – archaeologist
 Irene Manton – botanist
 Sidnie Manton – entomologist
 Onora O'Neill – philosopher
 Cecilia Payne-Gaposchkin – astronomer
 Catherine Peckham – doctor and scientist
 Joan Beauchamp Procter – zoologist, herpetologist

Sport
 Kitty Godfree – tennis player
 Lara Prior-Palmer – equestrian
 Cecilia Robinson – cricket
 Zoe de Toledo – rowing

Notable former staff
Margaret Cole – socialist politician, former Classics teacher
Gustav Holst – composer, pioneer of music education for girls
Nicola LeFanu – director of music during the 1970s

Controversy
The school was in the news in November 2017 with allegations of sexual abuse between the 1970s and 1990s. One teacher resigned on 22 November 2017 amidst these allegations.

References

External links

 Official School Website
 ISI Inspection Reports 
 Profile on the ISC website
 SPGS at The Good Schools Guide
 Tatler School Guide

Private girls' schools in London
Educational institutions established in 1904
Private schools in the London Borough of Hammersmith and Fulham
Member schools of the Girls' Schools Association
History of the London Borough of Hammersmith and Fulham
1904 establishments in England